The EuroDeaf, short for European Deaf Football Championships,  is a quadrennial European competitions in the association football sport for deaf people. It is organised by the European Deaf Sport Organization (EDSO). It was first held for men's teams in 1987, and for women's in 2011. The first women's championship was held in a different host country and at a different date the same year. Later, both championships were held in the same host country and at the same time.

Competitions by year
Men

Women

Medals summary

Men

Women

See also
World Deaf Football Championships

References

 
Recurring sporting events established in 1987
Recurring sporting events established in 2011
Quadrennial sporting events
Paralympic association football
Deaf football competitions
Deaf football